Maryam Diener-Sachs, born 25 September 1961 in Tehran, Iran, is an author, publisher and emeritus trustee of the Royal Academy of Arts. Her debut novel Sans te dire adieu (Without saying goodbye), initially published in French, has been translated into both German and English. Further novels include The Passenger (London 2013) and Beyond Black There Is No Colour, The Story of Forough Farrokhzad (London 2020).

In 2012, Maryam Diener founded, together with writer and publisher Wilfried Dickhoff, Éditions Moon Rainbow, a Berlin-based publishing house focusing on limited edition books presenting encounters between poetry and visual arts, e.g. Francesco Clemente & Bei Dao, Rosemarie Trockel & Henri Michaux, Marcel Broodthaers, Jean Fautrier & Francis Ponge and Etel Adnan & Eugénie Paultre.

Bibliography

Anthologies
Der Kuss (The Kiss), (1991)  
Der Mond (The Moon), (1998)

Photography
The Wild Emperor (2005, with Rolf Sachs)
Paradise Lost: Persia From Above

Stand-alone novels
Sans te dire adieu (Without saying goodbye)
The Passenger (London 2013)
Beyond Black There Is No Colour, The Story of Forough Farrokhzad (London 2020)

References

External links
 
 Éditions Moon Rainbow

Living people
1961 births
Iranian emigrants to the United Kingdom
Iranian writers